St. George's Church, Georgetown, Ontario, is a parish church of the Anglican Church of Canada, in the Anglican Diocese of Niagara.

History
St. George's Church was officially established in 1852 with the appointment of the parish's first full-time priest, The Reverend Thomas W. Marsh. The first St. George's Church was built in the late eighteen forties on land donated to the church by Mr. and Mrs. George Kennedy. The original church was a plain frame structure with tower and spire. It contained straight box pews and in the centre was a square enclosure used by the choir; the music being supplied by a small cabinet organ.

The first baptism recorded was of John Cook, farmer, Esquesing, who was born January 24, 1812, and who was baptized August 3, 1852, by the rector, Thomas Marsh. The first Confirmation was held on June 3, 1855, and was conducted by the Bishop of Toronto. The first Marriage performed at St. George's was celebrated on March 12, 1856, between William Long and Ann Price by the Rev'd Thomas Marsh. The first burial recorded in the registry of St. George's was for Thomas Manson Thompson, on Sept. 30th, 1852. And the first burial recorded in St. George's Burial Ground was Evan Price on June 2, 1855, also by the Rector, Thomas Marsh.

On July 25, 1878, the corner stone for the current stone building was laid and on December 29, 1878, the church was officially opened by Bishop Fuller. In the 1880s the rectory, for the priest and their family to live in was constructed on the land on the east side of the church. In 1921, an extension to the chancel was added making room for an organ chamber and below it a kitchen and a church school room. The following year, in 1922, St. George's began to hold Communion services each week, rather than the traditional once a month.

In 1973, St. George's parish hall was constructed where the old drive shed had once stood. In 2005, the rectory house was torn down due to mould.

Services
There are three Sunday services: 8:00 a.m. a quiet, traditional said Eucharistic service using the Book of Common Prayer, 9:30 a.m. the full Anglican Choral Eucharist service using the Book of Alternative Services, and 11:15 a.m. a Modern Eucharist.  Thursday at 10:00 a.m. is the weekly midweek Eucharist.

Messy Church
In April 2007 St. George's became the first church in Canada to join the Messy Church initiative. St. George's continues to offer "Messy Church" services on the second Wednesday of each month at 5:00 p.m. (not during summer).

Parish Rectors

The Reverend Thomas W. Marsh 1852 – 1856
The Reverend J. D. A. Mackenzie 1856 – 1859
The Reverend F. A. O'Meara 1859–1862
The Reverend H. C. Webbe 1862 – 1866
The Reverend Johnstone Vicars 1866 – 1868
The Reverend F. I. S. Groves 1868 – 1869
The Reverend Colin C. Johnson 1870 – 1875
The Reverend Arthur Boultbee 1875 – 1880
The Reverend G. B. Cook 1880 – 1882
The Reverend R. C. Caswall 1882 – 1884
The Reverend C. G. Adams 1885 – 1886
The Reverend Joseph Fennell 1886 – 1898
The Reverend E. A. Vesey 1899 – 1901
The Reverend T. G. Wallace 1901 – 1904
The Reverend Ian A. R. MacDonald 1904 – 1906
The Reverend Robert Atkinson 1906 – 1908
The Reverend A. B. Higginson 1909 – 1916
The Reverend William Burt 1916 – 1920
The Reverend Percival Mayes 1920 – 1926
The Reverend Frederick C. Wase 1926 – 1931
The Venerable William G. O. Thompson 1932 – 1954
The Reverend Kenneth S. G. Richardson 1954 – 1961
The Venerable  John H. McMulkin 1962 – 1966
The Reverend Eric C. Mills 1966 – 1971
The Reverend Robert Gallagher 1971 – 1978
The Reverend Roswell Tees 1979 – 1981
The Reverend James B. Boyles 1981 – 1987
The Reverend Canon Tom Kingston 1988 -2002
The Reverend Canon Robert W. A. Park 2002 – present

References

External links
St. George's Church

See also

Wilbur Lake

Religious organizations established in 1852
Churches completed in 1878
19th-century Anglican church buildings in Canada
Anglican church buildings in Ontario
Buildings and structures in the Regional Municipality of Halton